Gompholobium obcordatum is a species of flowering plant in the family Fabaceae and is endemic to the south-west of Western Australia. It is an erect, open shrub with heart-shaped leaves, the narrower end towards the base, and uniformly yellow, pea-like flowers.

Description
Flowering occurs from September to November and the fruit is a cylindrical pod.

Taxonomy
Gompholobium obcordatum was first formally described in 1853 by Nikolai Turczaninow in the Bulletin de la Société impériale des naturalistes de Moscou from specimens collected by James Drummond. The specific epithet (obcordatum) means "inverted heart-shaped", referring to the leaves.

Distribution and habitat
This species of gompholobium grows in sandy soil in the Avon Wheatbelt, Coolgardie and Geraldton Sandplains biogeographic regions of south-western Western Australia.

Conservation status
Gompholobium obcordatum is classified as "not threatened" by the Western Australian Government Department of Parks and Wildlife.

References

obcordatum
Eudicots of Western Australia
Plants described in 1853
Taxa named by Nikolai Turczaninow